Drug Abuse is the fifth album released by Detroit rapper Dice on Fallen Angelz Entertainment. Dice tried to illegally put this album out but was unsuccessful due to contract

Track listing

References

External links 
 Drug Abuse on Discogs

2008 albums
Dice (rapper) albums